Poppyhead may refer to:

The flower or fruit (seed pod) of a poppy;  see Papaveraceae
Poppy straw, the dried stalks, stem and leaves of cultivated poppies
Poppyhead (carving), on the ends of church stalls and benches